Unaccustomed As We Are is the first sound film comedy starring Stan Laurel and Oliver Hardy, released on May 4, 1929.

The title, Unaccustomed As We Are..., was a spoofing reference to the fact that its two stars had never before spoken in their films. And in point of fact, although it was a film with dialogue, the soundtrack mostly carried music, and sound effects, with dialogue a long way third.

In case the Talkies did not prove popular, and in order to be released in theatres which had not yet been converted for sound, Hal Roach hedged his bets by releasing it in both the new All-Talking format and in Silent format (in the latter case, with intertitles carrying the dialogue). As with the Laurel and Hardy silent films, visual gags remained the heart and soul of the picture: the characters were certainly talking, but the comedy was not yet in the dialogue, the film still relied entirely on sight-gags for its laughs.

Plot
Ollie brings Stan home for dinner and promises a big juicy steak, mushroom sauce, strawberries, whipped cream, a cup of coffee and a big black cigar. Despite the offer of such a delicious temptation, Stan still feels the need to ask if the meal includes any nuts.

When Oliver introduces Stan to Mrs Hardy (Mae Busch), she does not welcome the surprise and storms out in a huff. Mrs Kennedy (Thelma Todd), a neighbor from across the hall, offers to help the boys cook dinner; they, in turn, help to set her dress on fire. Mrs Hardy and Mr Kennedy (Edgar Kennedy), a cop, return and the boys hide the slip-clad Mrs K in a trunk.

Mrs Hardy apologizes to Oliver for earlier, and even brings some nuts for Stanley. However Oliver doesn't entertain her and announces that he's packed his trunk and is leaving for South America. This leads to a quarrel between Oliver and his wife, loud enough for Mr Kennedy to interrupt. Mrs Hardy explains the situation to Kennedy and runs off crying into the bedroom.

Kennedy warns them that if any man would interfere in his marriage, he would cut their throat. Oliver tries to hastily leave the room, with the trunk, but Mr Kennedy stops him and slams the trunk. This causes Mrs Kennedy to scream. Mr Kennedy understands what the boys are up to, so he calls Mrs Hardy and tells her to prepare a nice dinner for the boys, while he instructs them to take the trunk over to his apartment. Stan and Ollie do as they are told, and when Kennedy gets them behind his closed door he applauds their efforts, in a round-about way.

Unaware his wife is within earshot, Kennedy starts bragging to the boys about his "technique" in extramarital liaisons. His furious wife then confronts him about it, before giving him a bit of her own technique: throwing everything within range at him. Next door, Stan, Ollie and Mrs Hardy continue eating while trying to ignore the crashing, banging and shouting coming from the Kennedys' apartment.

When it eventually stops, Mr Kennedy shows up, battered, bruised and in a terrible state. He leads Ollie out with a whistle and beats him up. He then prepares to do the same to Stan, but his wife has not finished with him yet. She comes out of their apartment wielding a gigantic vase and, despite Mr Kennedy's efforts to protect himself, crashes it over his head, putting him out for the count. Having evaded a beating, Stan leaves as though nothing has happened, but then falls down the stairs (offscreen) -- as Ollie watches, flinching with every thump and loud crash as Stan reaches the bottom.

Cast
 Stan Laurel as Stan
 Oliver Hardy as Ollie
 Edgar Kennedy as Officer Kennedy
 Mae Busch as Mrs. Hardy
 Thelma Todd as Mrs. Kennedy

Production notes
Unaccustomed As We Are is notable for being Laurel and Hardy's first sound film as well as the first all talkie short film by Hal Roach (the title was drawn from the popular cliché "Unaccustomed as I am to public speaking ..."). The soundtrack was lost for 50 years until it was traced on disc in the late 1970s. A silent version, with intertitles, was also released, as well as a Victor disc International Sound Version (featuring a synchronized music score and sound effects).

This is the first film in which Hardy says to Laurel, "Why don't you do something to help me!" which became a catchphrase, repeated in numerous subsequent films. Also heard for the first time is Stan's distinctive, high-pitched whimper of distress.

The plot of Unaccustomed As We Are was expanded into the feature film Block-Heads in 1938. In addition, the gag of the spaghetti ending on Ollie's lap was originally conceived for their 1928 silent film Habeas Corpus, but was left unfilmed.

Edgar Kennedy appeared in numerous Laurel and Hardy films, almost always playing a cop or other authority figure, and when named on-screen his character almost invariably - as here - used his real name.

References

External links 
 
 
 
 

1920s English-language films
1929 comedy films
American black-and-white films
Short films directed by Lewis R. Foster
Laurel and Hardy (film series)
Metro-Goldwyn-Mayer short films
Films with screenplays by H. M. Walker
1929 short films
American comedy short films
1920s American films